Miss Earth Ecuador 2019 is the 3rd edition of Miss Earth Ecuador pageant. The election night was held August 10, 2019 in Samborondón where Diana Valdivieso from Manabí crowned Antonella Paz from Esmeraldas. The winner represented Ecuador at Miss Earth 2019 pageant.

Results

Placements

Special awards

Contestants

Notes

Debuts

 Loja
 Los Ríos

Returns

 Esmeraldas

Withdrawals

 El Oro
 Guayas
 Esmeraldas

Did not compete

 El Oro - Leydi Stefanía Nazareno Vélez

Crossovers

Andrea Aguilera won Reina de Ventanas 2018.

References

External links
Official Miss Ecuador website

2019 beauty pageants
Beauty pageants in Ecuador
Miss Earth